Ghorawal is a town and a nagar panchayat in Sonbhadra district in the Indian state of Uttar Pradesh.

Geography
It has an average elevation of 303 metres (994 feet).

Demographics
As per India Bureau Census Ghorawal has an estimated population of 9,800 in 2023. Males constitute 54% of the population and females 46%. Ghorawal has an average literacy rate of 59%, lower than the national average of 59.5%: male literacy is 69%, and female literacy is 47%. In Ghorawal, 18% of the population is under 6 years of age.

See also
Bhaiswar

References

Cities and towns in Sonbhadra district